Semantic mapping (SM) in statistics is a method  for dimensionality reduction (the transformation of data from a high-dimensional space into a low-dimensional space). SM can be used in a set of multidimensional vectors of features to extract a few new features that preserves the main data characteristics. 

SM performs dimensionality reduction by clustering the original features in semantic clusters and combining features mapped in the same cluster to generate an extracted feature. Given a data set, this method constructs a projection matrix that can be used to map a data element from a high-dimensional space into a reduced dimensional space.

SM can be applied in construction of text mining and information retrieval systems, as well as systems managing vectors of high dimensionality. SM is an alternative to random mapping, principal components analysis and latent semantic indexing methods.

See also
 Dimensionality reduction
 Principal components analysis
 Latent semantic indexing
 Unification (logic reduction)

References

 CORRÊA, R. F.; LUDERMIR, T. B. Improving Self Organization of Document Collections by Semantic Mapping. Neurocomputing(Amsterdam), v. 70, p. 62-69, 2006. doi:10.1016/j.neucom.2006.07.007
 CORRÊA, R. F. and LUDERMIR, T. B. (2007) "Dimensionality Reduction of very large document collections by Semantic Mapping". Proceedings of 6th Int. Workshop on Self-Organizing Maps (WSOM). .

External links
 Full list of publications about Semantic Mapping method

Dimension reduction